Majida Khattari (born 1966) is a Moroccan-born French multidisciplinary contemporary artist. Her work often addresses fashion and women’s bodies in contemporary Islam. She is known for her staged fashion show performances, which connect Western-style fashion shows to Islamic dress and culture.

Biography 
Majida Khattari was born in 1966 in Erfoud, Morocco. She attended the School of Fine Arts of Casablanca (1988 diploma), and by 1988 she moved to Paris to attend the Beaux-Arts de Paris (English: National School of Fine Arts of Paris; 1995 national higher diploma in plastic arts).

Shortly after she arrived in Paris, in September 1989 the Islamic scarf controversy in France was happening, when three female students were suspended for refusing to remove their scarves in class at middle school in Creil, became international news. This debate has drawn inspiration for her artwork.

Khattari's art is created in many different media, including photography, performance art, sculpture, video art, installation art, as well as others. Her work has been shown internationally including in Québec, Canada; Montreal, Canada (2015); London, England; Paris, France; and New York City, New York, United States.

See also 

 Culture of Morocco

References 

1966 births
People from Erfoud
Artists from Paris
Moroccan women artists
École des Beaux-Arts alumni
Moroccan contemporary artists
Living people